Firuz (also Romanized as Fīrūz; also known as Pādah Buland, Padeh Boland, and Pādeh Buland) is a village in Javaran Rural District, Hanza District, Rabor County, Kerman Province, Iran. At the 2006 census, its population was 87, in 17 families.

References 

Populated places in Rabor County